1-7 Argyle Place is a heritage-listed row of shops with overhead residences at 1, 3, 5 and 7 Argyle Place, Millers Point, City of Sydney, New South Wales, Australia. It was added to the New South Wales State Heritage Register on 2 April 1999.

History 

The row of shops and residences at 1-7 Argyle Place was built by the Sydney Harbour Trust in 1910 following the state resumption and reconstruction of the surrounding area following a turn-of-the-century outbreak of bubonic plague. It now forms an important element of the historic streetscape.

Ownership passed from the Trust to the Department of Housing in 1986. The shops were threatened with sale to private developers in 1988, but were saved in 1990 after a two-year community campaign. The campaign also resulted in an agreement whereby the City of Sydney leased the shops from the Department, with the council pledging to ensure they were kept as service stores for the local community. However, they were eventually put up for sale by the state government in 2006 and sold soon after.

Description
 
1-7 Argyle Place is a two-storey row of shops with residences overhead, built in the Federation style. It features face brick walls and chimneys, a slate roof to the main body of the building with corrugated galvanised iron verandah roofs, and painted pebble dash parapets.

The verandahs on the second storey have been filled in, and some sash windows were renewed in the 1990s.

Heritage listing 
An interesting example of early twentieth century commercial and residential development being part of the-post plague redevelopment, very important to the streetscape of Millers Point.

It is part of the Millers Point Conservation Area, an intact residential and maritime precinct. It contains residential buildings and civic spaces dating from the 1830s and is an important example of nineteenth-century adaptation of the landscape.

1-7 Argyle Place was listed on the New South Wales State Heritage Register on 2 April 1999.

See also 

Australian residential architectural styles
9 Argyle Place

References

Citations

Sources 

 

 Attribution

External links

 

New South Wales State Heritage Register sites located in Millers Point
Brick buildings and structures
Retail buildings in New South Wales
Houses in Millers Point, New South Wales
Articles incorporating text from the New South Wales State Heritage Register
1910 establishments in Australia
Commercial buildings completed in 1910
Federation style architecture
Millers Point Conservation Area